Terry Schreiber (born March 7, 1937) is an American theater director, acting teacher, and founder of the T. Schreiber Studio, in New York.

Schreiber was born in Winona, Minnesota. He has directed theatre, principally in New York, since 1976, at such venues as the Longacre Theatre, the Circle Repertory Theatre, the Brooks Atkinson Theatre, the Roundabout Theatre, as well as in Japan, regional repertory theatre, and at the Terry Schreiber Studio.

Career
Schreiber directed the Tony Award-winning play K2; Devour the Snow; The Trip Back Down, starring John Cullum; and Andorra

Featured in Eva Mekler's The New Generation of Acting Teachers, Terry Schreiber has been teaching and directing for over 46 years. On Broadway he directed the Tony-nominated play K2, The Trip Back Down starring John Cullum, and Devour the Snow. Off-Broadway his directing credits include Desire Under the Elms at The Roundabout Theatre with Kathy Baker and Feedlot at Circle Repertory with Jeff Daniels.

He has directed at regional theatres around the country including The Guthrie Theatre, Syracuse Stage, Hartman Theatre Co., Pittsburgh Public Theatre, Buffalo Arena Stage (directing Celeste Holm and Betty Buckley), and George Street Playhouse. Internationally, Terry has directed numerous American plays in Japan and has taught at the French American Cinema Theatre in Paris. He has directed Yasmine B. Rana's The Fallen and Blood Sky at the studio, and last Spring's production of Tennessee Williams', Summer and Smoke.

Other productions at the studio include: Hedda Gabler, Uncle Vanya, The Seagull, Orpheus Descending, The Iceman Cometh, Suddenly Last Summer, Summer and Smoke, Miss Julie, Joe Egg, Hamlet, Of Mice and Men, The Crucible, A Midsummer Night's Dream, The Birthday Party, The Homecoming, How I Learned to Drive, Sweet Bird of Youth, Night of the Iguana, The Real Thing, The Cherry Orchard, The Changing Room, and The Last Days of Judas Iscariot. Terry's first book, Acting: Advanced Technique for the Actor, Director, & Teacher is in its third printing, and his Producing on a Short Shoelace is now available in e-book form and deals with his many years of producing and directing Off-Off Broadway.

Notable students
Notable students include:
Edward Norton
Mary Louise Parker
Julie Halston
Judith Light
Cynthia Nixon
Wendy Wasserstein
Anthony Aibel
Marian Seldes
Gerald Schoenfeld
Betty Buckley
Amy Ryan
John Patrick Shanley
Anne Jackson
Eli Wallach
Roger Berlind
Jonny Orsini

Publications
Acting: Advanced Techniques for the Actor, Director, and Teacher, Allworth Press, 2005,

See also
T. Schreiber Studio

References

External links
 T. Schreiber Studio & Theatre

Living people
Drama teachers
American theatre directors
1937 births